"I'll Go Crazy" is a rhythm and blues song recorded by James Brown and The Famous Flames. Released as a single in 1960, it was Brown's fourth R&B hit, charting at #15. Brown and the Flames also performed it as the first song on their 1963 album Live at the Apollo.

The Live at the Apollo performance of "I'll Go Crazy" was also later released as the B-side of a single in 1966, backed with "Lost Someone" (also from the live album). It charted #38 R&B and #73 Pop.This live version was the last song featuring The Famous Flames to chart.

Personnel
 James Brown – lead vocal

and the Famous Flames:
 Bobby Byrd – vocals
 Bobby Bennett – vocals
 Baby Lloyd Stallworth - vocals 
 Johnny Terry – vocals
 Willie Johnson – vocals

with the James Brown Band:
 J.C. Davis – tenor saxophone
 Bobby Roach – guitar
 Bernard Odum – bass guitar
 Nat Kendrick – drums

plus:
 Sonny Thompson – piano
 James McGary – alto saxophone

Chart performance

Cover versions
"I'll Go Crazy" has inspired cover versions by many different artists, including:

Tommy James and the Shondells released a cover version of the song on their debut album, Hanky Panky. 
The Rolling Stones
The Kingsmen
The Blues Magoos
The Residents
The Moody Blues
The Buckinghams
Chris Isaak
Jerry Garcia and David Grisman
Buddy Guy
The Nighthawks
Tommy Quickly
Graham Bonnet
Delfini
The Honeycombs live in Tokyo
Clarence Clemons.

Popular culture
It was performed by Dan Aykroyd in the actor's tribute to Brown on his induction at the 2003 Kennedy Center Honors.
This song was used on the Late Show with David Letterman as theme music for the "Who Said It?" segment.

References

1960 singles
Songs written by James Brown
James Brown songs
The Famous Flames songs
The Rolling Stones songs
The Moody Blues songs
Tommy James and the Shondells songs
1959 songs
King Records (United States) singles
Federal Records singles